A ghost band is a legacy band that performs under the name of a deceased leader. In rock and roll, it is a band that performs under the name of the band whose founders are either deceased or have left the band.  Use of the phrase may refer to a repertory jazz ensemble, such as a Dixieland band, with a longstanding, historic name.  But in the strictest sense, a ghost band is connected in some way to a deceased leader.

Origin of the phrase
Gene Lees, Woody Herman's biographer, and several other sources attribute the coining of the phrase to Woody Herman, who used it to refer to successors of dance bands from the 1930s, 1940s, and 1950s.

The Vanguard Jazz Orchestra is a ghost band with a twist: the name is new, but the band is closely identified as being the legacy of The Thad Jones/Mel Lewis Orchestra, and like the Mingus Band, is producing new works.  Thad Jones, who had once been a trumpeter with the Count Basie Orchestra, led Count Basie's ghost band with critical acclaim.

Authorization 
Ghost bands fall into three categories: (i) authorized, (ii) unauthorized, and (iii) unspecified.  Authorized ghost bands fall into two sub-categories: (a) authorized under the will of the decedent and (b) authorized by agreement with the heirs, successors, and assigns to the rights of the name.  Unauthorized ghost bands are those that exist in the face of opposition, or those that prevail in a legal challenge.  Unspecified ghost bands subsist with no preference or will given.  In this case, more than one band might subsist, and even remain unopposed if money is not an issue.

Ghost bands often do not have full access to unpublished, original music arrangements.  In lieu of ghost bands, some leaders have opted to bestow their music and papers to academic institutions, in some cases, to music schools devoted to research, restoration, and repertory studies, and in other cases, to alma maters.

Connotation 
The phrase "ghost band" is sometimes viewed as an underhanded way (pejorative way) of saying that the ensemble is not the "real McCoy".  Not being the "real McCoy" does not automatically mean "inferior."  The current pool of virtuoso musicians, world-wide, is abundant. Moreover, ghost bands in recording studios are often composed of high-caliber musicians who might have otherwise been (a) unwilling to tour full-time, back in the day or (b) too expensive or (c) both.  Willingness to embrace the phrase is mixed.  Legacy bands – those that have grown new, distinct identities and have generated new works – value their roots; but they also appreciate recognition for their contributions to the art.  From a branding perspective, some repertory big bands, such as the Glenn Miller Orchestra, embrace the phrase as a statement of commitment to the preservation of the original sound.

Dance bands and jazz
In dance band and big band jazz idioms, ghost bands typically perform the repertoire of the original band. Exceptions, however, include the Mingus Big Band, which performs and records new works in the creative spirit of its founder, Charles Mingus. The examples of Miller and Mingus are, in a sense, the same because both are striving to preserve the original models.

The estates of some notable band leaders, such as those of Stan Kenton and Maynard Ferguson, specifically forbid ghost bands in their names.

Popular music
In classic rock/pop/R&B, a ghost band may refer to a group composed of musicians from newer generations and perhaps owned or led offstage by a secondary founding member who may perform, or may not even perform with the group as is the case with Blood, Sweat & Tears and The Platters. Many classic rock/pop acts still tour with musicians who were in the last stages of their success and weren't founding, crucial or irreplaceable members of those acts, such as Little River Band.  Other acts such as The Grass Roots, The Guess Who, The Temptations, and others are now led by a drummer, bassist, or other background rhythm musician or backing vocalist who had little to do with the unique original sound (as compared to a lead instrumentalist or lead vocalist who made the sound identifiable to fans). These acts typically play at festivals, casinos, cruise ships, clubs, theaters and small venues, typically billed with other similar acts in "oldies packages", and are essentially tribute acts in all but name only.

Notable ghost bands 
Jazz

 Glenn Miller Orchestra
 Mingus Big Band
 Duke Ellington Orchestra
 Count Basie Orchestra
 The Modernaires
 Harry James Orchestra
 Les Elgart Orchestra
 Hal Mcintyre Orchestra
 Nelson Riddle Orchestra
 Cab Calloway Orchestra
 Tommy Dorsey Orchestra
 Les Brown's Band of Renown
 Russ Morgan Orchestra
 Sammy Kaye Orchestra
 Jimmy Dorsey Orchestra
 Jan Garber Orchestra
 Dick Jurgens Orchestra
 Gene Krupa Orchestra
 Guy Lombardo Orchestra
 Xavier Cugat Orchestra
 Artie Shaw Orchestra
 Lester Lanin Orchestra
 Woody Herman Orchestra
 Chick Webb
 Ted Heath
 Sun Ra Arkestra

Classic rock, R&B, and pop

 Blood, Sweat & Tears
 Dr. Feelgood
 Mahavishnu Project
 Bob Jackson's Badfinger
 Little River Band
 Creedence Clearwater Revisited
 The Platters
 The Grass Roots
 The Orchestra (formerly known as "ELO Part II")
 Iron Butterfly
 Quiet Riot
 Herman's Hermits
 Molly Hatchet

Related musical terminology
Tribute band – Tribute bands can also be ghost bands.  Three fundamental distinctions: (1) tribute bands can play music of living artists, (2) tribute bands can be a one-time concert or recording by any group of musicians, and (3) tribute bands can showcase other subjects, such as a particular composer or arranger.  This category can also refer to ad hoc groups that appear occasionally with a big-name leader, a number of star soloists and arrangers from the big-band era. Leaders who did this included Illinois Jacquet, Gerry Mulligan, and Louis Bellson.
Cover band – Cover bands can also be ghost bands.  A distinction is that cover bands can play music of living artists and are usually not confined to one artist.
 There are several well-known bands that have endured for decades – bands that are promoted and perceived to be continuations of the original.  These types of bands are analogous to franchises, except, instead of multiple bands touring under the same name, only one band performs, but with a turnover of musicians.  Examples include Tower of Power (currently in its  year).

See also
 Zombie strip, a comic strip continued by one or more artists and/or authors after the death or retirement of its original creator(s)
 Ship of Theseus

References

Musical terminology
Types of musical groups
Jazz terminology